Microtis familiaris, commonly known as the coastal mignonette orchid or coastal onion orchid is a species of orchid endemic to the south-west coastal region of Western Australia. It has a single hollow, onion-like leaf and up to twenty small, green to greenish-yellow, sweetly scented, widely spaced flowers. It often grows with large populations of other Microtis orchids but only flowers after fire.

Description
Flowering occurs from December to January but only after fire the previous summer.

Taxonomy and naming
Microtis familiaris was first formally described in 1990 by Robert John Bates from a specimen collected at Boat Harbour near Denmark and the description was published in Journal of the Adelaide Botanic Gardens. The specific epithet (familiaris) is a Latin word meaning "of a family or household" or "domestic", referring to the observation that this orchid often grows with other Microtis species.

Distribution and habitat
The coastal mignonette orchid grows in swampy heath in coastal areas between Augusta and Esperance in the Esperance Plains, Jarrah Forest and Warren biogeographic regions.

Conservation
Microtis familiaris is classified as "not threatened" by the Western Australian Government Department of Parks and Wildlife.

References

External links
 

familiaris
Endemic orchids of Australia
Orchids of Western Australia
Plants described in 1990